Messier 87 (also known as Virgo A or NGC 4486, generally abbreviated to M87) is a supergiant elliptical galaxy in the constellation Virgo that contains several trillion stars. One of the largest and most massive galaxies in the local universe, it has a large population of globular clusters — about 15,000 compared with the 150–200 orbiting the Milky Way — and a jet of energetic plasma that originates at the core and extends at least , traveling at a relativistic speed. It is one of the brightest radio sources in the sky and a popular target for both amateur and professional astronomers.

The French astronomer Charles Messier discovered M87 in 1781, and cataloged it as a nebula. Unlike a disk-shaped spiral galaxy, M87 has no distinctive dust lanes. Instead, it has an almost featureless, ellipsoidal shape typical of most giant elliptical galaxies, diminishing in luminosity with distance from the center. Forming around one-sixth of its mass, M87's stars have a nearly spherically symmetric distribution. Their population density decreases with increasing distance from the core. It has an active supermassive black hole at its core, which forms the primary component of an active galactic nucleus. The black hole was imaged using data collected in 2017 by the Event Horizon Telescope (EHT), with a final, processed image released on 10 April 2019. In March 2021, the EHT Collaboration presented, for the first time, a polarized-based image of the black hole which may help better reveal the forces giving rise to quasars.

The galaxy is a strong source of multi-wavelength radiation, particularly radio waves. Its interstellar medium consists of diffuse gas enriched by elements emitted from evolved stars.

Observation history
In 1781, the French astronomer Charles Messier published a catalogue of 103 objects that had a nebulous appearance as part of a list intended to identify objects that might otherwise be confused with comets. In subsequent use, each catalogue entry was prefixed with an "M". Thus, M87 was the eighty-seventh object listed in Messier's catalogue. During the 1880s, the object was included as NGC 4486 in the New General Catalogue of nebulae and star clusters assembled by the Danish-Irish astronomer John Dreyer, which he based primarily on the observations of the English astronomer John Herschel.

In 1918, the American astronomer Heber Curtis of Lick Observatory noted M87's lack of a spiral structure and observed a "curious straight ray ... apparently connected with the nucleus by a thin line of matter." The ray appeared brightest near the galactic center. The following year, a supernova within M87 reached a peak photographic magnitude of 21.5, although this event was not reported until photographic plates were examined by the Russian astronomer Innokentii A. Balanowski in 1922.

Identification as a galaxy

In 1922, the American astronomer Edwin Hubble categorized M87 as one of the brighter globular nebulae, as it lacked any spiral structure, but like spiral nebulae, appeared to belong to the family of non-galactic nebulae. In 1926 he produced a new categorization, distinguishing extragalactic from galactic nebulae, the former being independent star systems. M87 was classified as a type of elliptical extragalactic nebula with no apparent elongation (class E0).

It was then the only known elliptical nebula for which individual stars could be resolved, although it was pointed out that globular clusters would be indistinguishable from individual stars at such distances. In his 1936 The Realm of the Nebulae, Hubble examines the terminology of the day; some astronomers labeled extragalactic nebulae as external galaxies on the basis that they were stellar systems at far distances from our own galaxy, while others preferred the conventional term extragalactic nebulae, as galaxy was at that time a synonym for the Milky Way. M87 continued to be labelled as an extragalactic nebula at least until 1954.

Modern research
In 1947, a prominent radio source, Virgo A, was identified overlapping the location of M87. The source was confirmed to be M87 by 1953, and the linear relativistic jet emerging from the core of the galaxy was suggested as the cause. This jet extended from the core at a position angle of 260° to an angular distance of 20″ with an angular width of 2″. In 1969–1970, a strong component of the radio emission was found to closely align with the optical source of the jet.
In 1966, the United States Naval Research Laboratory's Aerobee 150 rocket identified Virgo X-1, the first X-ray source in Virgo. The Aerobee rocket launched from White Sands Missile Range on 7 July 1967 yielded further evidence that the source of Virgo X-1 was the radio galaxy M87. Subsequent X-ray observations by the HEAO 1 and Einstein Observatory showed a complex source that included the active galactic nucleus of M87. However, there is little central concentration of the X-ray emission.

M87 has been an important testing ground for techniques that measure the masses of central supermassive black holes in galaxies. In 1978, stellar-dynamical modeling of the mass distribution in M87 gave evidence for a central mass of five billion  solar masses. After the installation of the COSTAR corrective-optics module in the Hubble Space Telescope in 1993, the Hubble Faint Object Spectrograph (FOS) was used to measure the rotation velocity of the ionized gas disk at the center of M87, as an "early release observation" designed to test the scientific performance of the post-repair Hubble instruments. The FOS data indicated a central black hole mass of 2.4 billion , with 30% uncertainty. Globular clusters within M87 have been used to calibrate metallicity relations as well.

M87 was observed by the Event Horizon Telescope (EHT) during much of 2017. The event horizon of the black hole at the center was directly imaged by the EHT, then revealed in a press conference on the issue date stated, filtering out from this the first image of a black hole's shadow.

Visibility

M87 is near a high declination limit of the Virgo constellation, abutting Coma Berenices. It lies along the line between the stars Epsilon Virginis and Denebola (Beta Leonis). Viewing the jet is a challenge without the aid of photography. Before 1991, the Ukrainian-American astronomer Otto Struve was the only person known to have seen the jet visually, using the  Hooker telescope. In more recent years it has been observed in larger amateur telescopes under excellent conditions.

Properties
In the modified Hubble sequence galaxy morphological classification scheme of the French astronomer Gérard de Vaucouleurs, M87 is categorized as an E0p galaxy. "E0" designates an elliptical galaxy that displays no flattening — that is, it appears spherical. A "p" suffix indicates a peculiar galaxy that does not fit cleanly into the classification scheme; in this case, the peculiarity is the presence of the jet emerging from the core. In the Yerkes (Morgan) scheme, M87 is classified as a type-cD galaxy. A D galaxy has an elliptical-like nucleus surrounded by an extensive, dustless, diffuse envelope. A D type supergiant is called a cD galaxy.

The distance to M87 has been estimated using several independent techniques. These include measurement of the luminosity of planetary nebulae, comparison with nearby galaxies whose distance is estimated using standard candles such as cepheid variables, the linear size distribution of globular clusters, and the tip of the red-giant branch method using individually resolved red giant stars.

M87 is one of the most massive galaxies in the local Universe. Its diameter is estimated at 132,000 light-years, which is approximately 51% larger than that of the Milky Way. As an elliptical galaxy, the galaxy is a spheroid rather than a flattened disc, accounting for the substantially larger mass of M87. The total mass of M87 may be 200 times that of the Milky Way.

The galaxy experiences an infall of gas at the rate of two to three solar masses per year, most of which may be accreted onto the core region. Beyond that distance the outer edge of the galaxy has been truncated by some means; possibly by an earlier encounter with another galaxy. There is evidence of linear streams of stars to the northwest of the galaxy, which may have been created by tidal stripping of orbiting galaxies or by small satellite galaxies falling in toward M87. Moreover, a filament of hot, ionized gas in the northeastern outer part of the galaxy may be the remnant of a small, gas-rich galaxy that was disrupted by M87 and could be feeding its active nucleus. M87 is estimated to have at least 50 satellite galaxies, including NGC 4486B and NGC 4478.

The spectrum of the nuclear region of M87 shows the emission lines of various ions, including hydrogen (HI, HII), helium (HeI), oxygen (OI, OII, OIII), nitrogen (NI), magnesium (MgII), and sulfur (SII). The line intensities for weakly ionized atoms (such as neutral atomic oxygen, OI) are stronger than those of strongly ionized atoms (such as doubly ionized oxygen, OIII). A galactic nucleus with such spectral properties is termed a LINER, for "low-ionization nuclear emission-line region". The mechanism and source of weak-line-dominated ionization in LINERs and M87 are under debate. Possible causes include shock-induced excitation in the outer parts of the disk or photoionization in the inner region powered by the jet.

Elliptical galaxies such as M87 are believed to form as the result of one or more mergers of smaller galaxies. They generally contain relatively little cold interstellar gas (in comparison with spiral galaxies) and they are populated mostly by old stars, with little or no ongoing star formation. M87's elliptical shape is maintained by the random orbital motions of its constituent stars, in contrast to the more orderly rotational motions found in a spiral galaxy such as the Milky Way. Using the Very Large Telescope to study the motions of about 300 planetary nebulae, astronomers have determined that M87 absorbed a medium-sized star-forming spiral galaxy over the last billion years. This has resulted in the addition of some younger, bluer stars to M87. The distinctive spectral properties of the planetary nebulae allowed astronomers to discover a chevron-like structure in M87's halo which was produced by the incomplete phase-space mixing of a disrupted galaxy.

Components

Supermassive black hole M87*

The core of the galaxy contains a supermassive black hole (SMBH), designated M87*, whose mass is billions of times that of the Earth's Sun; estimates had ranged from   to  , surpassed by   in 2016. This is one of the highest known masses for such an object. A rotating disk of ionized gas surrounds the black hole, and is roughly perpendicular to the relativistic jet. By comparison, Pluto averages  from the Sun. Gas accretes onto the black hole at an estimated rate of one solar mass every ten years (about 90 Earth masses per day). The diameter of the accretion disk, as seen from Earth, is 42 μas (microarcsecond), and the diameter of the black hole itself is 15 μas. By comparison, the diameter of the core of M87 is 45" (as, arcsecond), and the size of M87 is 7.2' x 6.8' (am, arcminute).

This was claimed to be in the opposite direction of the known jet, indicating acceleration of the black hole by it. Another suggestion was that the offset occurred during the merger of two supermassive black holes. However, a 2011 study did not find any statistically significant displacement, and a 2018 study of high-resolution images of M87 concluded that the apparent spatial offset was caused by temporal variations in the jet's brightness rather than a physical displacement of the black hole from the galaxy's center.

This black hole is the first to be imaged. Data to produce the image were taken in April 2017, the image was produced during 2018 and was published on 10 April 2019. The shadow radius is 2.6 times that of the black hole's Schwarzschild radius.

After the black hole had been imaged, it was named Pōwehi, a Hawaiian word meaning "the adorned fathomless dark creation", taken from the ancient creation chant Kumulipo.

On 24 March 2021, the Event Horizon Telescope collaboration revealed a unprecedented unique view of the M87 black hole shadow: how it looks in polarized light. Polarization is a powerful tool which allows astronomers to probe physics behind the image in more detail. Light polarization informs us about the strength and orientation of magnetic fields in the ring of light around the black hole shadow. Knowing those is essential to understand how M87's supermassive black hole is launching jets of magnetized plasma, which expand at relativistic speeds beyond the M87 galaxy.

On 14 April 2021, astronomers further reported that the M87 black hole and its surroundings were studied during Event Horizon Telescope 2017 observing run also by many multi-wavelength observatories from around the world.

Jet

The relativistic jet of matter emerging from the core extends at least  from the nucleus and consists of matter ejected from a supermassive black hole. The German-American astronomer Walter Baade found that light from the jet was plane polarized, which suggests that the energy is generated by the acceleration of electrons moving at relativistic velocities in a magnetic field. The total energy of these electrons is estimated at  ergs ( or ). This is roughly  times the energy produced in the entire Milky Way in one second, which is estimated at  The jet is surrounded by a lower-velocity non-relativistic component. There is evidence of a counter jet, but it remains unseen from the Earth due to relativistic beaming.

In pictures taken by the Hubble Space Telescope in 1999, the motion of M87's jet was measured at four to six times the speed of light. This phenomenon, called superluminal motion, is an illusion caused by the relativistic velocity of the jet. The time interval between any two light pulses emitted by the jet is, as registered by the observer, less than the actual interval due to the relativistic speed of the jet moving in the direction of the observer. This results in perceived faster-than-light speeds, though the jet itself has a velocity of only 80-85% the speed of light. Detection of such motion is used to support the theory that quasars, BL Lacertae objects and radio galaxies may all be the same phenomenon, known as active galaxies, viewed from different perspectives. It is proposed that the nucleus of M87 is a BL Lacertae object (of lower luminosity than its surrounds) seen from a relatively large angle. Flux variations, characteristic of the BL Lacertae objects, have been observed in M87.

Observations indicate that the rate at which material is ejected from the supermassive black hole is variable. These variations produce pressure waves in the hot gas surrounding M87. The Chandra X-ray Observatory has detected loops and rings in the gas. Their distribution suggests that minor eruptions occur every few million years. One of the rings, caused by a major eruption, is a shock wave  in diameter around the black hole. The regular eruptions prevent a huge reservoir of gas from cooling and forming stars, implying that M87's evolution may have been seriously affected, preventing it from becoming a large spiral galaxy.

M87 is a very strong source of gamma rays, the most energetic rays of the electromagnetic spectrum. Gamma rays emitted by M87 have been observed since the late 1990s. In 2006, using the High Energy Stereoscopic System Cherenkov telescopes, scientists measured the variations of the gamma ray flux coming from M87, and found that the flux changes over a matter of days. This short period indicates that the most likely source of the gamma rays is a supermassive black hole. In general, the smaller the diameter of the emission source, the faster the variation in flux.

By 2006, the X-ray intensity of this knot had increased by a factor of 50 over a four-year period, while the X-ray emission has since been decaying in a variable manner.

The interaction of relativistic jets of plasma emanating from the core with the surrounding medium gives rise to radio lobes in active galaxies. The lobes occur in pairs and are often symmetrical. The two radio lobes of M87 together span about 80 kiloparsecs; the inner parts, extending up to 2 kiloparsecs, emit strongly at radio wavelengths. Two flows of material emerge from this region, one aligned with the jet itself and the other in the opposite direction. The flows are asymmetrical and deformed, implying that they encounter a dense intra-cluster medium. At greater distances, both flows diffuse into two lobes. The lobes are surrounded by a fainter halo of radio-emitting gas.

Interstellar medium
The space between the stars in M87 is filled with a diffuse interstellar medium of gas that has been chemically enriched by the elements ejected from stars as they passed beyond their main sequence lifetime. Carbon and nitrogen are continuously supplied by stars of intermediate mass as they pass through the asymptotic giant branch. The heavier elements from oxygen to iron are produced largely by supernova explosions within the galaxy. Of the heavy elements, about 60% were produced by core-collapse supernovae, while the remainder came from type Ia supernovae.

The distribution of oxygen is roughly uniform throughout, at about half of the solar value (i.e., oxygen abundance in the Sun), while iron distribution peaks near the center where it approaches the solar iron value. Since oxygen is produced mainly by core-collapse supernovae, which occur during the early stages of galaxies, and mostly in outer star-forming regions, the distribution of these elements suggests an early enrichment of the interstellar medium from core-collapse supernovae and a continuous contribution from type Ia supernovae throughout the history of M87. The contribution of elements from these sources was much lower than in the Milky Way.

Examination of M87 at far infrared wavelengths shows an excess emission at wavelengths longer than 25 μm. Normally, this may be an indication of thermal emission by warm dust. In the case of M87, the emission can be fully explained by synchrotron radiation from the jet; within the galaxy, silicate grains are expected to survive for no more than 46 million years because of the X-ray emission from the core. This dust may be destroyed by the hostile environment or expelled from the galaxy. The combined mass of dust in M87 is no more than 70,000 times the mass of the Sun. By comparison, the Milky Way's dust equals about a hundred million solar masses.

Although M87 is an elliptical galaxy and therefore lacks the dust lanes of a spiral galaxy, optical filaments have been observed in it, which arise from gas falling towards the core. Emission probably comes from shock-induced excitation as the falling gas streams encounter X-rays from the core region. These filaments have an estimated mass of about 10,000 . Surrounding the galaxy is an extended corona with hot, low-density gas.

Globular clusters
M87 has an abnormally large population of globular clusters. A 2006 survey out to an angular distance of 25′ from the core estimates that there are  clusters in orbit around M87, compared with 150–200 in and around the Milky Way. The clusters are similar in size distribution to those of the Milky Way, most having an effective radius of 1 to 6 parsecs. The size of the M87 clusters gradually increases with distance from the galactic center. Within a  radius of the core, the cluster metallicity — the abundance of elements other than hydrogen and helium — is about half the abundance in the Sun. Outside this radius, metallicity steadily declines as the cluster distance from the core increases. Clusters with low metallicity are somewhat larger than metal-rich clusters. In 2014, HVGC-1, the first hypervelocity globular cluster, was discovered escaping from M87 at 2,300 km/s. The escape of the cluster with such a high velocity was speculated to have been the result of a close encounter with, and subsequent gravitational kick from, a supermassive black hole binary.

Almost a hundred ultra-compact dwarfs have been identified in M87. It is unclear whether they are dwarf galaxies captured by M87 or a new class of massive globular cluster.

Environment

M87 is near (or at) the center of the Virgo Cluster, a closely compacted structure of about 2,000 galaxies. This forms the core of the larger Virgo Supercluster, of which the Local Group (including the Milky Way) is an outlying member. It is organized into at least three distinct subsystems associated with the three large galaxies — M87, M49 and M86 — with the core subgroup including M87 (Virgo A) and M49 (Virgo B). There is a preponderance of elliptical and S0 galaxies around M87. A chain of elliptical galaxies roughly aligns with the jet. In terms of mass, M87 is likely to be the largest, and coupled with centrality appears to be moving very little relative to the cluster as a whole. It is defined in one study as the cluster center. The cluster has a sparse gaseous medium that emits X-rays, lower in temperature toward the middle. The combined mass of the cluster is estimated to be 0.15 to 

Measurements of the motion of those intracluster starburst ("planetary") nebulae between M87 and M86 suggest that the two galaxies are moving toward each other and that this may be their first encounter. M87 may have interacted with M84, as evidenced by the truncation of M87's outer halo by tidal interactions. The truncated halo may also have been caused by contraction due to an unseen mass falling into M87 from the rest of the cluster, which may be the hypothesized dark matter. A third possibility is that the halo's formation was truncated by early feedback from the active galactic nucleus.

See also
 List of Messier objects
 List of largest galaxies

Notes

References

External links

 Messier 87, SEDS Messier pages
 ESA/Hubble images of M87
 
 Solar elemental abundances

 
Messier 087
Messier 087
Messier 087
Messier 087
Messier 087
087
Messier 087
07654
41316
152
274
Astronomical objects discovered in 1781
Discoveries by Charles Messier